Karpoš is a village in the municipality of Kumanovo, North Macedonia.

Demographics
According to the 2002 census, the village had a total of 5433 inhabitants. Ethnic groups in the village include:

Macedonians 4907
Albanians 1
Serbs 503
Romani 14
Others 8

References

External links

Villages in Kumanovo Municipality